The 2018 Atlantic 10 men's soccer tournament, was the 21st edition of the Atlantic 10 Men's Soccer Tournament. It will determined the Atlantic 10 Conference's automatic berth into the 2018 NCAA Division I Men's Soccer Championship. The tournament  began on November 4 and concluded on November 11. Saint Louis University hosted the semifinals and championship matches with these fixtures contested at Hermann Stadium.

Rhode Island won the A-10 Tournament, giving the Rams their first Atlantic 10 Conference championship, as well as first NCAA berth since 2006. Rhode Island defeated George Mason in the final, and bested regular season champions, VCU, in the semifinals, and last year's NCAA quarterfinalists, Fordham in the quarterfinals. George Mason defeated Saint Louis and Dayton to reach the championship match.

Defending champions, UMass, were eliminated by the virtue of penalty kicks to VCU in the quarterfinal round.

Rhode Island was the only Atlantic 10 team this year to earn a berth into the NCAA Tournament. In the NCAA Tournament, they were eliminated in the first round by Connecticut off of a golden goal.

Seeds

Bracket

Results

Quarterfinals

Semifinals

Final

Statistics

Goalscorers
1 Goal

  Clement Benhaddouche – UMass
  Chae Brangman – Rhode Island
  Tyler Dickson – Rhode Island
  Jared Greene – VCU
  Elias Harryson – Dayton
  Lucas Hauth – Davidson
  Pablo Pertusa – George Mason
  Dominik Richter – Rhode Island
  Grant Robinson – George Mason
  Emil Jesman Sunde – Rhode Island
  Rok Taneski – Dayton
  Stavros Zarokostas – Rhode Island

Awards and honors 

 Tournament MVP: Tyler Dickson, Rhode Island

All-Tournament team:

 Chae Brangman, Rhode Island
 Tyler Dickson, Rhode Island
 Clark Gronek, George Mason
 Elias Harryson, Dayton
 Dominik Richter, Rhode Island
 Grant Robinson, George Mason

 Roger Penske, Rhode Island
 Pablo Pertusa, George Mason
 Mario Sequeira, VCU
 Rok Taneski, Dayton
 Stavros Zarokostas, Rhode Island

References

External links 
 2018 Atlantic 10 Men's Soccer Championship
 Bracket

Atlantic 10 Men's Soccer Tournament
Atlantic 10 Men's Soccer
Atlantic 10 Men's Soccer
Atlantic 10 Men's Soccer
Atlantic 10 Men's Soccer